is a Japanese badminton player and member of the NTT East badminton team.

Achievements

Asian Junior Championships 
Girls' doubles

BWF International Challenge/Series (5 titles, 1 runner-up) 
Women doubles

Mixed doubles

  BWF International Challenge tournament
  BWF International Series tournament
  BWF Future Series tournament

References

External links 

 

1996 births
Living people
Sportspeople from Saitama Prefecture
Japanese female badminton players
21st-century Japanese women